Nina Hollensen (born 24 April 1992) is a Danish rower. She competed in the women's double sculls event at the 2016 Summer Olympics.

References

External links
 

1992 births
Living people
Danish female rowers
Olympic rowers of Denmark
Rowers at the 2016 Summer Olympics
Place of birth missing (living people)